Paul Raeth (20 November 1898 – 8 July 1989) was a French diver. He competed in the men's 3 metre springboard event at the 1924 Summer Olympics.

References

External links
 

1898 births
1989 deaths
French male divers
Olympic divers of France
Divers at the 1924 Summer Olympics
Sportspeople from Colmar
20th-century French people